The 1996/97 FIS Freestyle Skiing World Cup was the eighteenth World Cup season in freestyle skiing organised by International Ski Federation. The season started on 5 December 1996 and ended on 15 March 1997. This season included five disciplines: aerials, moguls, dual moguls, ballet and combined.

This season combined events were last time on world cup calendar for men and none for ladies. Dual moguls counted as season title and was awarded with small crystal globe separately from moguls.

Men

Moguls

Aerials

Ballet

Combined

Ladies

Moguls

Aerials

Ballet

Men's standings

Overall 

Standings after 38 races.

Moguls 

Standings after 7 races.

Aerials 

Standings after 12 races.

Ballet 

Standings after 9 races.

Dual moguls 

Standings after 6 races.

Combined 

Standings after 4 races.

Ladies' standings

Overall

Standings after 33 races.

Moguls

Standings after 7 races.

Aerials

Standings after 11 races.

Ballet

Standings after 9 races.

Dual moguls

Standings after 6 races.

References

FIS Freestyle Skiing World Cup
World Cup
World Cup